Behuyeh (also Romanized as Behūyeh and Behvieh; also known as Būhū) is a village in Deh Chah Rural District, Poshtkuh District, Neyriz County, Fars Province, Iran. At the 2006 census, its population was 359, in 90 families.

References 

Populated places in Neyriz County